Jiri Vlcek ( (born 27 May 1978) is a Czech-born Italian rower.

References

External links
 

1978 births
Living people
Italian male rowers
Sportspeople from Mladá Boleslav
Olympic rowers of Italy
Rowers at the 2008 Summer Olympics
Italian people of Czech descent
World Rowing Championships medalists for Italy
Rowers of Fiamme Oro
European Rowing Championships medalists